Nana Chowk is a neighbourhood in Mumbai. It is named after the philanthropist Jagannath Shankarshet also known as "Nana". The area lies in the Grant Road area.

References 

Neighbourhoods in Mumbai
Streets in Mumbai